This is a list of puzzle topics, by Wikipedia page.

 Acrostic
 Anagram
 Back from the klondike
 Ball-in-a-maze puzzle
 Brain teaser
 Burr puzzle
 Chess problem
 Chess puzzle
 Computer puzzle game
 Cross Sums
 Crossword puzzle
 Cryptic crossword
 Cryptogram
 Daughter in the box
 Disentanglement puzzle
 Edge-matching puzzle
 Egg of Columbus
 Eight queens puzzle
 Einstein's Puzzle
 Eternity puzzle
 Fifteen puzzle
 Fox, goose and bag of beans puzzle
 Geomagic square
 Globe puzzle
 Graeco-Latin square
 Gry
 Happy Cube
 Induction puzzles
 Insight
 Jigsaw puzzle
 Kakuro
 KenKen
 Knights and knaves
 Knight's Tour
 Lateral thinking
 Latin square
 Letter bank
 Lock puzzle
 Logic puzzle
 Magic square
 Mahjong solitaire
 Matchstick puzzle
 Mathematical puzzle
 Maze
 Mechanical puzzle
 Merkle's Puzzles
 Minus Cube
 Morpion solitaire
 N-puzzle
 National Puzzlers' League
 Nikoli
 Nine dots puzzle
 Nob Yoshigahara Puzzle Design Competition
 Nurikabe
 Packing problem
 Paint by numbers
 Peg solitaire
 Pentomino
 Pirate loot problem
 Plate-and-ring puzzle
 Problem solving
 Rattle puzzle
 Rebus
 Riddles
 Rubik's Cube
Speedcubing
Pocket Cube
 Rubik's Magic
 Rubik's Revenge
 Rush Hour (puzzle)
 Situation puzzle
 Sliding puzzle
 Snake cube
 Sokoban
 Soma cube
 Sphere packing
 Stick puzzle
 Sudoku
 Tangram
 Three-cottage problem
 Three cups problem
 Tiling puzzle
 Tour puzzle
 Tower of Hanoi
 T puzzle
 Tsumego
 Tsumeshogi
 Verbal arithmetic
 Wire puzzle
 Wire-and-string puzzle
 XYZZY Award for Best Individual Puzzle

People

 Araucaria
 David J. Bodycombe
 Emily Cox 
 Henry Dudeney
 Tony Fisher
 Martin Gardner
 Scott Kim
 Lloyd King
 Sam Loyd
 Uwe Mèffert
 Larry D. Nichols
 Henry Rathvon
 Tom M. Rodgers
 Ernő Rubik
 Mike Selinker
 Will Shortz
 Jerry Slocum
 Stephen Sondheim
 Jelmer Steenhuis
 Oskar van Deventer
 Nob Yoshigahara
 Kit Williams
 Arthur Wynne

Puzzles

Puzzle
Puzzle
Puzzle